The 2000 Army Black Knights football team was an American football team that represented the United States Military Academy as a member of Conference USA (C-USA) in the 2000 NCAA Division I-A football season. In their first season under head coach Todd Berry, the Black Knights compiled a 1–10 record and were outscored by their opponents by a combined total of 372 to 224.  In the annual Army–Navy Game, the Black Knights lost to Navy, 30–28.

Schedule

Personnel

References

Army
Army Black Knights football seasons
Army Black Knights football